Alaur Rahman (born 1960) is a Bangladeshi-born British singer.

Early life
Rahman was born in Alagdi, Jagannathpur, Sunamganj, Sylhet District, East Pakistan (now Bangladesh). He attended Madrasa, primary school and The Aided High School, where he would also sing hamd, na'at, qasida and other religious songs as well as songs dedicated to Bangladesh. In 1977, at the age of 14, Rahman came to the United Kingdom with his parents. He attended Pandit Horidas Ganguly School where he learned North Indian classical music.

Career
In 1985, Rahman appeared on BBC programme Naya Zindagi, Naya Jeevan and sang ghazal and modern songs live. In the same year, Rahman recorded a 12-track debut album Smaranepare (Shoronay Poray). Rahman composed music for all 12-tracks, which were arranged by Qutbuddin and the lyrics were written by Abdul Mukit, Nurul Ghani, Delwar Khan and Shamsheer Qureshi. The album was produced and released by Jhankar Music. In 1986, he performed on Bangladesh Television (BTV).

In 1992, he performed on television programme about he Bangladeshi community of East London. In the 1990s, Rahman became one of the leading singers in Britain's Bengali community and went on to sell numerous songs. His musical influences are Mohammed Rafi, Mehdi Hassan, Ghulam Ali, Nurul Ghani and Talat Mahmood.

Rahman moved onto making spiritual and religious music and was selected by Ekushey Television to be the voice of the Adhan (call to prayer).

Rahman has released 40 albums, which include Hindi and Bangla songs. His best of album Best of Alaur Rahman was released by Serengeti Sirocco. His songs are about the loss of a sense of belonging and the material conditions that underpin his life in Britain.

Awards
Rahman has won numerous awards globally. These have included awards from Zee TV, Channel i, ATN, Bangla TV and Channel S, where he has won awards for being the best singer.

Personal life
In 1986, Rahman married Rozi Rahman. They have two sons Rabi and Raid, and a daughter Aniqa.

See also
British Bangladeshi
List of British Bangladeshis
Music of Bengal

References

External links

Alaur Rahman  on British Bangladeshi Who's Who
Iqbal, Jamil. Mr. Alaur Rahman. Swadhinata Trust. 7 April 2006

1960 births
Living people
Date of birth missing (living people)
Bangladeshi Muslims
20th-century Bangladeshi male singers
20th-century Bangladeshi singers
Bangladeshi emigrants to England
21st-century Bangladeshi male singers
21st-century Bangladeshi singers
21st-century British male singers
Hindi-language singers
Bengali-language singers
Urdu-language singers
Singers from London
People from Jagannathpur Upazila
The Aided High School alumni
University of Dhaka alumni